The Dajbabska Gora Tower is a radio frequency spectrum control tower located on Dajbabska Gora, a hill in the south of Podgorica, Montenegro. It is 55 meters tall, and soon after its opening it became one of the most popular landmarks and visitor attractions of the city.

Construction

The tower was built by the Agency for Electronic Communications and Postal Services of Montenegro during a 3-year period, from 2008 to 2011. The whole project was marred by controversy, mostly regarding the construction costs of cca. 5 million euros. It was officially opened on 15 October 2011.

References

External links
 
 aerial view of the tower

Tourist attractions in Podgorica
Towers in Montenegro
Towers completed in 2011
2011 establishments in Montenegro